Eurata spegazzinii is a moth of the subfamily Arctiinae. It was described by Peter Jörgensen in 1913 and it is found in Argentina.

References

External links
Original description: Zeitschrift für wissenschaftliche Insektenbiologie. 

Arctiinae